François Bœspflug (May 30, 1945) is a French historian of Christianity and Christian art, in particular of the Middle Ages. He specialises in the iconography of the Bible moralisée.

Biography

Education 
François Bœspflug undertook a scientific curriculum that led him to the l'École nationale supérieure des mines de Saint-Étienne, where he was a student from 1964 to 1965. From 1969 to 1975, he obtained a degree in scholastic philosophy and a master's degree in theology from the Catholic University of Paris. In 1982, he obtained two postgraduate doctorates after having defended his doctoral thesis on "Dieu dans l’art" ("God in Art"), subsequently going on to publish numerous works on Christian iconography. He also pursued research on the history of representations of God and the Trinity in Medieval Europe.

Teaching 
Bœspflug has been a lecturer at the Catholic University of Paris (1984-1987), lecturer at the School for Advanced Studies in the Social Sciences (1987-1990), professor of the history or religions at the Faculté de théologie catholique de Strasbourg (1990-2013), and professor and/or director of research at the Centre Sèvres, Institut de recherche et d'histoire des textes, University of Geneva, and Free University of Brussels (1994-2008).

Religious Order 
Bœspflug was a priest and member of the Dominican Order 1965 to 2015. He was holder of the seat of Pope Benedict XVI in Regensburg in 2013 and was a literary director at the religious publishing house Éditions du Cerf from 1982 to 1999. He left the Dominican order and the priesthood when he married in 2015. At his request, he was defrocked from his clerical state in 2018.

Views
Bœspflug denounces the celibacy of men of the Church, and regularly intervenes in the media on questions relating to the Catholic Church, but also more generally on the representations of the divine in all religions.

Works 

François Bœspflug with Emanuela Fogliadini (2019). Cruxifixion - la crucifixion dans l'art, un sujet planétaire, Montrouge: Bayard, . OCLC 1127756076.
François Bœspflug and Emanuela Fogliadini (2020): La risurrezione di Cristo nell’arte d’Oriente e d’Occidente, Mailand: Jaca Book, ISBN 9788816605916.
François Bœspflug e Emanuela Fogliadini (2021): Il battesimo di Cristo, Mailand: Jaca Book, ISBN 9788816606562.

Participations 
 2004 : Lettres à Dieu, collectif, Calmann-Lévy.
 2004 : Religions, les mots pour en parler. Notions fondamentales en Histoire des religions, F. Boespflug, Th. Legrand et A.-L. Zwilling, Paris / Genève, Bayard / Labor et Fides.

Tribute 
 Une certaine image de Dieu, Hommage à François Bœspflug, edited by Michel Deneken, Thierry Legrand, Anne-Laure Zwilling, Presses universitaires de Strasbourg, 2015.

References 

1945 births
Historians of the Catholic Church
French art historians
French Dominicans
Living people